Peter Hofstede (born January 28, 1967 in Oosterbeek, Gelderland) is a retired football striker from the Netherlands, who made his professional debut in the 1990-1991 season for De Graafschap. Later on he played for Roda JC, FC Utrecht, Helmond Sport, FC Emmen, and ADO Den Haag.

References
  Profile
  Profile

1967 births
Living people
People from Renkum
Footballers from Gelderland
Dutch footballers
Dutch republicans
Association football forwards
Eredivisie players
Eerste Divisie players
Roda JC Kerkrade players
De Graafschap players
FC Emmen players
ADO Den Haag players
Helmond Sport players
FC Utrecht players